In model theory and set theory, which are disciplines within mathematics, a model  of some axiom system of set theory  in the language of set theory is an end extension of , in symbols , if 

Mathematical logic
Model theory
Set theory